The 1992–93 Primeira Divisão was the 59th edition of top flight of Portuguese football. It started on 30 August 1992 with a match between Vitória de Guimarães and Beira-Mar, and ended on 13 June 1993. The league was contested by 18 clubs with Porto as the defending champions.

Porto qualified for the 1993–94 UEFA Champions League first round, Benfica qualified for the 1993–94 European Cup Winners' Cup first round, and Sporting CP, Boavista and Marítimo qualified for the 1993–94 UEFA Cup; in opposite, Tirsense, Espinho and Chaves were relegated to the Liga de Honra. Jorge Cadete was the top scorer with 17 goals.

Promotion and relegation

Teams relegated to Liga de Honra
Torreense
Penafiel
União da Madeira

Torreense, Penafiel, and União da Madeira were consigned to the Liga de Honra following their final classification in 1991-92 season.

Teams promoted from Liga de Honra
Espinho
Belenenses
Tirsense

The other three teams were replaced by Espinho, Belenenses, and Tirsense from the Liga de Honra.

Teams

Stadia and locations

Managerial changes

League table

Results

Top goalscorers

Source: Foradejogo

Footnotes

External links
 Portugal 1992-93 – RSSSF (Jorge Miguel Teixeira)
 Portuguese League 1992/93 – footballzz.co.uk
 Portugal – Table of Honor – Soccer Library 

Primeira Liga seasons
Port
1992–93 in Portuguese football